WNWS (1520 AM) is a radio station  broadcasting a soft adult contemporary format. Licensed to Brownsville, Tennessee, United States, the station is owned by the Wireless Group Inc.

References

External links

NWS
Soft adult contemporary radio stations in the United States
NWS